Joseph "Peppi" Azzopardi (born August 25, 1959), from Floriana is a Maltese TV personality, best known for hosting Malta's longest-lasting TV programme and most popular talk show Xarabank from 1997 to 2020. He also hosts L-Istrina, a yearly telethon programme, televised every Boxing Day across the three main terrestrial TV stations in Malta. Azzopardi is also a founder of the TV production company "Where's Everybody".

References

External links
 Xarabank Future Still in the Balance
 Xarabank Remains Most Popular Programme
 Xarabank Page on TVM website
 Maltatoday interview
 

Living people
Maltese television presenters
1959 births